Destination Films is a division of Sony Pictures Entertainment currently specializing in action, thriller, niche sci-fi and low-end to medium-end horror films.

History 
The original Destination Films was founded by Brent Baum and Steve Stabler in 1998. The company made a deal with Columbia TriStar Home Video to have them distribute their films for video release. The company was shut down in February 2001 after failing to meet financial expectations. The company's library and in-production projects such as The Wedding Planner and Slackers were sold off to Sony Pictures for distribution.

In 2002, Destination Films was revived as a division of Columbia TriStar Home Entertainment, with the anime film Metropolis being scheduled for their first release, although the film Shiri would be released a couple weeks before. Many of the films released on home entertainment under Destination Films would receive a small theatrical release beforehand from either other Sony Pictures divisions like TriStar Pictures and Screen Gems or third-party distributors like Samuel Goldwyn Films. In 2007, Sony Pictures Worldwide Acquisitions took over and has released some films under Destination Films' label, like Blood: The Last Vampire, Black Dynamite and Harry Brown.

Filmography

References

External links 
 
 

Sony Pictures Entertainment Motion Picture Group
Sony Pictures Entertainment
Mass media companies established in 1998
1998 establishments in California
Anime companies
Film production companies of the United States